Ringsend is a small village and electoral ward near Coleraine, County Londonderry, Northern Ireland. It is situated within Causeway Coast and Glens district, and in the 2011 Census the population for the electoral ward was 2,455. There is both a Mass Rock and Priest Chair nearby which were used during anti-Popery laws.

References

Villages in County Londonderry
Causeway Coast and Glens district